A Shu’ai, Shu’i or  Shuw'i is a small or medium-sized dhow, a traditional Arabic sailing vessel. This type of dhow is built low with a high quarter deck and has one or two masts with lateen sails. A general purpose coastal boat, the shu’ai is one of the smaller-size dhow of Persian Gulf.

Formerly Shu’ai was the most common dhow in the Persian Gulf used for fishing as well as for coastal trade. Some Shu'ai have been converted into motorboats after being fitted with engines instead of sails, especially in the Persian Gulf area.

See also
Dhow
Baghlah
Batil (ship)
Beden
Boom (ship)
Ghanjah
Sambuk

References

Bibliography 
 .
 Hawkins, Clifford W. (1977). The Dhow: An Illustrated History Of The Dhow And Its World. Nautical Publishing Co. Ltd, 
 Hourani, George F. (1995). Arab Seafaring in the Indian Ocean in Ancient and Early Medieval Times. Princeton: Princeton University Press.

Further reading 
 Tibbetts, G.R. (2002) Arab Navigation in the Indian Ocean before the Coming of the Portuguese: being a translation of Kitāb al-Fawā'id fī uṣūl al-baḥr wa-'l-qawā'id by Aḥmad Ibn Mādjid al-Nadjdī. London: Routledge. Amazon

External links

 A survey of Traditional Vessels of the Sultanate of Oman. The Omani Dhow Recording Project Field Research, 1992

Dhow types
Sailing ships
Arab inventions
Tall ships